John Matthews Manly (September 2, 1865 — April 2, 1940) was an American professor of English literature and philology at the University of Chicago. Manly specialized in the study of the works of William Shakespeare and Geoffrey Chaucer. His eight-volume work, The Text of the Canterbury Tales (1940), written in collaboration with his former student Edith Rickert, has been cited as a definitive study of Chaucer's works.

Early life and education
Manley was born in Virginia the son of Charles Manly, a Baptist minister and university president. He attended Staunton Military Academy and Greenville Military Institute. At the age of 18, Manly earned a master's degree in Mathematics from Furman University. In 1890, he received a PhD from Harvard University in Philology, a non-departmental field for which he created his own curriculum.

Career
In 1884, at the age of 19, Manly accepted a position at William Jewell College teaching Mathematics which he held for five years. After taking his doctorate in 1890 and teaching Anglo-Saxon at Radcliffe for a year, Manly accepted a call to Brown University and became one of the chief members of the English staff there, until 1898. He then accepted the department chair in English at the University of Chicago which he maintained until retirement.

He gave the 1926 Warton Lecture on English Poetry. In 1931 he published a paper in Speculum disproving William Romaine Newbold's deciphering of the Voynich Manuscript.

Selected publications
 as editor: 
 with Edith Rickert: ;

References

External links
List of John Matthews Manly publications
 Full Text of "Contemporary British Literature: Bibliographies and Study Outlines," by John Matthews Manly and Edith Rickert.
 
 
Guide to the John Matthews Manly Papers 1885-1940 at the University of Chicago Special Collections Research Center

1865 births
1940 deaths
University of Chicago faculty
Brown University faculty
Furman University alumni
Harvard University alumni
Philologists
Shakespearean scholars
Chaucer scholars
Fellows of the Medieval Academy of America
Linguists from the United States
Presidents of the Modern Language Association